Rob Dyrdek's Fantasy Factory is an American reality television series that aired on MTV from February 8, 2009, to March 5, 2015. 

On September 17, 2013, it was announced that Fantasy Factory was renewed for a sixth season, which premiered on January 16, 2014. The sixth season was originally announced to be the final season, but in June 2014, MTV announced that Fantasy Factory would return for a seventh season. The seventh season premiered on January 1, 2015, and ended on March 5, 2015.

As of 2022, the entire series is available to stream on Paramount+, except for a few episodes.

Synopsis
The factory is a space for skateboarder Rob Dyrdek to manage two aspects of his life, business and pleasure. The 25,000-square-foot complex contains two distinct areas: A warehouse designed for skateboarding and an office complex. Dyrdek's cousin, Christopher "Drama" Pfaff serves as Dyrdek's assistant on the show. Christopher "Big Black" Boykin, originally from Rob & Big, made his debut appearance to the Fantasy Factory beginning in the fourth season. Rashawn "Bam Bam" Davis, who co-starred with Rob, Big Black, and Drama in Rob & Big, made his first appearance in the Fantasy Factory on the third episode of Season 5.

Throughout the series, guest appearances included Ryan Sheckler,  John Mayer, Danny Way, Steve Berra, Ludacris, and Johnny Knoxville and Chris Pontius from Jackass.

Cast
 Rob Dyrdek, professional skateboarder, president of Dyrdek Enterprises, Street League Skateboarding, Rob Dyrdek's Wild Grinders, former star of Rob & Big and creator and host of Ridiculousness
 Sterling "Steelo" Brim, friend of Rob Dyrdek and co-host with him on MTV's Ridiculousness
 Christopher "Big Black" Boykin (Seasons 4-7), Rob's former bodyguard and roommate, co-star of Rob & Big
 Chanel West Coast, Fantasy Factory's receptionist, secretary, Young & Reckless model, co-host on Ridiculousness
 Christopher "Drama" Pfaff, Rob's cousin, producer, owner/creator of Young & Reckless clothing
 Scott "Big Cat" Pfaff, Drama's older brother, Rob's cousin, "Facilitator", skate technician, owner/creator of Born a Lion clothing
 Geoff Taylor, general counsel for all Dyrdek related businesses
 Tracy Tubera, creative director for Wild Grinders, Rob's toy line and animated series
 Tony "Blurry" Turbo  (Seasons 1-3), Fantasy Factory's maintenance man; his face is pixelated
 Jeremy Larner (Seasons 1-3),  Rob's manager
 Gene Dyrdek, Rob's Dad
 Patty Dyrdek, Rob's Mom

Episodes

References

External links
 
 

2000s American reality television series
2010s American reality television series
2009 American television series debuts
English-language television shows
MTV original programming
2015 American television series endings
Television series by Dickhouse Productions